Krystal Vee, is a Thai actress, model and producer.

Vee worked as a model in Singapore, Hong Kong, Malaysia and the Philippines. 

Vee starred alongside Victor Webster in 2012's The Scorpion King 3: Battle for Redemption.

Filmography
 Maid (2004) - Paula
 Street Fighter: The Legend of Chun-Li (2009) - Lucy  
 The Lazarus Papers (2010) - Nana   
 The Scorpion King 3: Battle for Redemption (2012) - Silda
 Nighthawks in Banglok (2013 short) - Proy
 Trafficker (2015) - Ling
 Star Trek: Captain Pike (2016) - Captain Julie Decker
 The Untold Story (2017) - Natasha

References

External links
 Official Facebook
 Official Twitter
 

Krystal Vee
Krystal Vee
Krystal Vee
Living people
Krystal Vee
Krystal Vee
Year of birth missing (living people)